The 1947 Yukon general election was held on 13 February 1947 to elect the three members of the Yukon Territorial Council. The council was non-partisan and had merely an advisory role to the federally appointed Commissioner.

Members
Dawson - John Fraser
Mayo - Ernest Corp
Whitehorse - Richard Lee

References

1947
1947 elections in Canada
Election
February 1947 events in Canada